Serkan Göksu (born 19 May 1993) is a Turkish footballer who plays as a midfielder for Ümraniyespor.

Professional career
A youth product of Galatasaray and Batı Trakyaspor, Göksu signed his first professional contract with Galatasaray in 2013 and immediately went on loan with Bayrampaşaspor in the TFF Second League. For the following season 2013-14, he went on loan to Yeni Malatyaspor. On 17 November 2014, he transferred to the TFF First League club Altınordu where he became captain and had over 100 appearances. On 26 May 2018, he transferred to Ümraniyespor. In the 2021-22 season, he helped Ümraniyespor come in 2nd in the TFF First League and earned promotion to the Süper Lig. He made his professional debut with Ümraniyespor in a 3–3 Süper Lig tie with Fenerbahçe on 8 August 2022.

References

External links
 

1993 births
Living people
Footballers from Istanbul
Turkish footballers
Galatasaray S.K. footballers
Yeni Malatyaspor footballers
Altınordu F.K. players
Ümraniyespor footballers
Süper Lig players
TFF First League players
TFF Second League players
Association football midfielders